Phenylglyoxylic acid is the organic compound with the formula C6H5C(O)CO2H. The conjugate base, known as benzoylformate is the substrate of benzoylformate decarboxylase, a thiamine diphosphate-dependent enzyme:
benzoylformate + H+  benzaldehyde + CO2
It is a colourless solid with a melting point of 64–66 °C and is moderately acidic (pKa = 2.15).

Phenylglyoxylic acid can be synthesized by oxidation of mandelic acid with potassium permanganate. An alternative synthesis involves hydrolysis of benzoyl cyanide.

References

Carboxylic acids
Phenyl compounds